Leo Berman (October 21, 1935 – May 23, 2015) was an American businessman, military officer, and politician from Tyler, Texas, who was a Republican member of the Texas House of Representatives for District 6 in Smith County from 1999 to 2013. He was first elected in the general election held in November 1998. In January 2011, Berman announced a challenge to Speaker Joe Straus of San Antonio for the presiding officer's position but subsequently withdrew from the race. Though Representative Warren Chisum of Pampa filed his candidacy for Speaker, Straus was handily reelected to a second term in the leadership in January 2011.

References

External links
Representative Leo Berman official Texas House of Representatives site
 

2015 deaths
1935 births
American people of Latvian-Jewish descent
American people of Polish-Jewish descent
Republican Party members of the Texas House of Representatives
Politicians from New York City
People from Tyler, Texas
People from Arlington, Texas
Texas city council members
Businesspeople from Texas
Converts to Anglicanism from Judaism
Southern Methodist University alumni
United States Army officers
Recipients of the Air Medal
21st-century American politicians
20th-century American businesspeople
20th-century American Episcopalians
Military personnel from Texas